Chadwick International is a PK-12, coeducational, nonsectarian, non-profit, independent, international day school located in the Songdo International City, Republic of Korea. The curriculum is based on the International Baccalaureate (IB) program and received PYP, MYP, DP, and CP accreditations. It is currently run by the Roessler-Chadwick Foundation and is named after Chadwick School in Palos Verdes, California, United States.

History
Chadwick International was created in 2010 with a 150 billion won (US$135 million) investment by the Incheon Metropolitan City government as part of the $40+ billion Songdo International Business District.

Extracurricular Activities

Athletics
Chadwick International is a part of KAIAC (Korean-American Interscholastic Activities Conference) among 17 other international schools located in South Korea, and competes in a variety of sports against members of the KAIAC school league.

The school has two indoor gymnasiums equipped with a rock-climbing wall, an athletic field, a running track, five tennis courts, an indoor 25m pool along with a dance studio and a weight training room.

Chadwick International offers a variety of sports available to students, with some that allow for students to continue off season practices and participate in competitions all year.

Village school sports 

 Badminton
 Basketball
 Cross country
 Flag football
 Floor hockey
 Soccer
 Swimming
 Table tennis
 Tennis
 Track and field
 Ultimate Frisbee
 Volleyball

Middle school sports 

 Badminton
 Boys Badminton
 Girls Badminton

 Basketball
 Boys Basketball
 Girls Basketball

 Cheerleading

 Cross country
 Boys Cross Country
 Girls Cross Country

 Dance

 Fit team

 Golf
 Boys Golf
 Girls Golf

 Soccer
 Boys Soccer
 Girls Soccer

 Swimming
 Boys Swimming
 Girls Swimming

 Table tennis

 Tennis
 Boys Tennis
 Girls Tennis

Upper school sports 

 Badminton
 Boys Badminton 
 Girls Badminton 

 Basketball
 Boys Basketball 
 Girls Basketball
 
 Cheerleading

 Cross country
 Boys Cross country 
 Girls Cross country 

 Dance

 Fit team

 Soccer
 Boys Soccer 
 Girls Soccer 

 Swimming
 Boys Swimming
 Girls Swimming 

 Tennis
 Boys Tennis
 Girls Tennis 

 Track and field
 Boys Track and field
 Girls Track and field

 Golf
 Boys Golf
 Girls Golf

Outdoor Education
Chadwick International has also begun an outdoor education program like its sister school, Chadwick School. Chadwick International's Outdoor Education (OE) Program allows for students from Pre-K to Grade 12 to explore the outdoors in various locations within Korea, progressively lengthening the trip as the students rise in grade level.

During the 20–21 school year, Chadwick International hosted its Outdoor Education within Songdo International City, with activities planned around local parks and tents set up inside campus.

Statistics and Figures
 As of 2021, the tuition fee for Chadwick International for a full year are KRW 22,950,000 + USD 13,020 for Village School (PK-G5), KRW 24,670,000 + USD 13,990 for Middle School (G6-G8), and KRW 27,000,000 + USD 15,320 (G9-G12).
Additional fees for new students are the application fee of KRW 400,000 and matriculation fee of KRW 1,000,000.
Admissions start from the start of November to late January. (For the 2021–2022 school year, applications were accepted from November 2, 2020, to January 18, 2021.)

References

Educational institutions established in 2010
Buildings and structures in Incheon
American international schools in South Korea
International Baccalaureate schools in South Korea
2010 establishments in South Korea
Kohn Pedersen Fox buildings
Songdo International Business District